Ecitomyia is a genus of flies in the family Phoridae.

Species
E. aberrans Borgmeier, 1960
E. brevipennis Borgmeier, 1960
E. juxtaposita Borgmeier, 1960
E. longipennis Borgmeier, 1960
E. luteola Borgmeier & Schmitz, 1923
E. manni Brues, 1925
E. minuscula Borgmeier & Schmitz, 1923
E. ocellata Borgmeier, 1960
E. wheeleri Brues, 1901

References

Phoridae
Platypezoidea genera